Patrick Egglestone (17 March 1927 – July 2015) was an English professional footballer who played as a goalkeeper. He made 215 appearances in the Football League playing for Bradford City, Halifax Town, Shrewsbury Town and Wrexham.

Career
Born in Penrith, Egglestone played for Bradford City, Leeds United, Portsmouth, Halifax Town, Shrewsbury Town, Wrexham and Corby Town.

For Bradford City he made 2 appearances in the Football League.

Sources

References

1927 births
2015 deaths
People from Penrith, Cumbria
English footballers
Association football goalkeepers
Bradford City A.F.C. players
Leeds United F.C. players
Portsmouth F.C. players
Halifax Town A.F.C. players
Shrewsbury Town F.C. players
Wrexham A.F.C. players
Corby Town F.C. players
English Football League players
Footballers from Cumbria